New Horizons is the sixth album by the Los Angeles, California-based R&B group the Sylvers.

Reception

Released in November 1977, this would be their third and final studio album for Capitol Records.

Two singles from the set were released: "Any Way You Want Me" and "New Horizons".

On July 23, 2012, New Horizons was released on a double-album CD along with their first Capitol record, Showcase.

Track listing
"New Horizons" (Leon Sylvers III, Ricky Sylvers)
"Dressed to Kill" (Leon Sylvers III, Ricky Sylvers)
"Lovin' Me Back" (Leon Sylvers III, Patricia Sylvers)
"The Party Maker" (Leon Sylvers III, Foster Sylvers, Ricky Sylvers, James Sylvers, Edmund Sylvers)
"Take a Hand" (Leon Sylvers III, Foster Sylvers)
"Any Way You Want Me" (Leon Sylvers III, Edmund Sylvers)
"Another Day to Love" (Leon Sylvers III, John McClain)
"You Bring the Sunshine (Back Into My Life)" (Leon Sylvers III, Angie Sylvers)
"Charisma" (Leon Sylvers III)
"Star Fire" (Leon Sylvers III, Ricky Sylvers, Patricia Sylvers, James Sylvers)

Personnel
 Leon Sylvers III – bass
 Ed Greene, Steve Gadd – drums
 John Burnes, Sonny Burke, Victor Feldman – electric piano
 Herman Brown, Jay Graydon, John McClain, Ricky Sylvers – guitar
 Victor Feldman – percussion, vibraphone
 Richard Tee – piano
 Jim Horn, Tom Scott – saxophone
 James Sylvers, Jim Hughart – synthesizer
 Chuck Findley, Dick "Slyde" Hyde – trombone
 Gene Goe, Ollie Mitchell – trumpet

Production
Shusei Nagaoka - cover art

Charts

Singles

Samples
"New Horizons"
"Hot 4 U"" by A Tribe Called Quest on their The Love Movement album

References

External links
 New Horizons at Discogs

1977 albums
The Sylvers albums
Capitol Records albums
Albums with cover art by Shusei Nagaoka